The world's largest dairy companies by revenue made with dairy products are estimated and ranked annually by the Rabobank.

2022

2021

2020

2019

2018

2017

References 

Dairy industry
Dairy products companies
Dairy